Viktor Ivanovich Mednov (27 November 1927 – 22 June 2009) was a Russian boxer from the Soviet Union who won a silver medal in the light welterweight division at the 1952 Olympics. He had a difficult second bout with Francisc Ambrus of Romania, with Mednov prevailing when the referee stopped the bout due to bad cuts sustained by both opponents. Mednov had a break in the semifinal, as Erkki Mallenius withdrew with a hand injury. In the final he was defeated by Chuck Adkins in a 2–1 decision. This was the first boxing match between boxers from the United States and the Soviet Union.

Mednov was known for his strength and power – he could hold the Azaryan Cross on gymnastic rings and punched the bags in training so viciously that his hands were bleeding despite ample protection (elastic bandages and full-size competition gloves). In retirement he worked as a boxing coach for his sports society Trudovye Rezervy and painted landscapes as a hobby.

1952 Olympic results

Below are Viktor Mednov's results from the 1952 Olympic boxing tournament in Helsinki, Finland where Mednov competed for the Soviet Union as a light welterweight:

 Round of 32: defeated Norman Jones (Australia) TKO 2
 Round of 16: defeated Fransisc Ambrus (Romania) referee stopped bout due to cuts
 Quarterfinal: defeated Rene Weismann (France) by decision (3-0)
 Semifinal: defeated Erkki Aarno Mallenius (Finland) by walkover
 Final: lost to Charles Adkins (USA) by decision (1-2); was awarded silver medal

Charles Adkins bout vs. Viktor Mednov was the first ever sanctioned world class boxing match between U.S. and Soviet boxers.

References 

1927 births
Soviet male boxers
Boxers at the 1952 Summer Olympics
Olympic boxers of the Soviet Union
Olympic silver medalists for the Soviet Union
2009 deaths
Olympic medalists in boxing
Russian male boxers
Honoured Masters of Sport of the USSR
Medalists at the 1952 Summer Olympics
Light-welterweight boxers